Cylindrepomus rubriceps is a species of beetle in the family Cerambycidae. It was described by Per Olof Christopher Aurivillius in 1907. It is known from Borneo, Java and Sumatra.

References

Dorcaschematini
Beetles described in 1907